Yanam is a town located in the Yanam district in Puducherry. It has a population of 35,000 and is entirely surrounded by Andhra Pradesh. It was formerly a French colony for nearly 200 years, and, though united with India in 1954, is still sometimes known as "French Yanam". It possesses a blend of French culture and the Telugu culture, nicknamed Frelugu. During French rule, the Tuesday market (Marché du mardi or Mangalavaram Santa) at Yanam was popular among the Telugu people in the Madras Presidency, who visited Yanam to buy foreign and smuggled goods during Yanam People's Festival held in January. After implementation of the Child Marriage Restraint Act, 1929 in British India, Telugu people often traveled to Yanam to conduct child marriages, which remained legal under the French administration.

History

There was a rumour among some natives that Yanaon was a Dutch colony prior to French takeover in the 1720s but there are no substantial information to establish it as a fact. Indigo wells (Neelikundilu) are still found in the west of Yanam. The Dutch built a fort, which they used to store their currency, minted at nearby Neelapalli. The location of the fort is today referred to by locals as the Saali Kota or Saalivandru, meaning "shawl-hut", since after the demise of the Dutch, the building was taken over by cloth weavers.

There is a rumour that the region was presented to the French General, the Marquess of Bussy, by the king of Vizianagaram as a token of gratitude for Bussy's help in his fight against the rulers of Bobbili. There remains a street named after Bussy in Yanam.

The French established a trading post at Yanaon in 1723, making it the third French colony established in India but gave up the area in 1727, after commercial operations proved unsuccessful, but was seized again by Governor-General Dupleix in 1731 but got confirmed by Nizam of Hyderabad in 1751. Until the end of Napoleonic wars, Yanam went under British control intermittently but was finally restored back to France again in 1814.

Aftermath of liberation
The Yanam coup d'état dated 13 June 1954 had enraged the French authorities of Puducherry. Rumours were spread to the effect that the French government were despatching a cruiser to Yanam to capture Merger leaders and to re-establish their authority. After the coup, the last administrator of Yanam, George Sala was recalled by André Ménard, then Governor General of Puducherry in June 1954.

Dadala was also appointed as Acting Commissioner for Yanam for 14 days. Towards the end of June 1954, Kewal Singh paid a visit to Yanam and requested Dadala's return to Pondicherry to continue his activities there. On 3 July, on Kewal Singh's request, Dadala left Yanam, after making all arrangements for its proper administration.

De facto transfer
Yanam remained under French control till 13 June 1954, when it joined the Republic of India by Indian military action. On 1 November 1954, after long years of freedom struggle the de facto transfer (Vāstavikāntaraṇa) of the four enclaves of Pondicherry, Yanam, Mahé, and Karikal to India was achieved.

The Prime Minister, Jawaharlal Nehru, visited Puducherry on 16 January 1955. Messrs Edouard Goubert, S. Perumal, Dadala and Sri Pakirisamy Pillai presented addresses to Pandit Nehru in a public meeting in the maidan of Gorimedu. Since 2014, 1st of November is celebrated as Liberation day throughout Puducherry U.T. and is a public Holiday. This initiative has been taken shortly after the NDA government had taken power in 2014 and then newly appointed Lt. Governor A. K. Singh had issued a notification regarding that decision of central government.

1956 Treaty of cession
A treaty of cession was signed by the two countries on 28 May 1956. The de jure transfer was delayed until the end of the Algerian War. The treaty was ratified by the French parliament in May 1962. On 16 August 1962 (De Jure Day) India and France exchanged the instruments of ratification under which France ceded to India full sovereignty over the territories it held.

Special administration status
According to Traité de cession dated 1956, the four former French colonies were assured of maintaining their special administrative status. That is why Puducherry is the only Union Territory with some special provisions like Legislative Assembly, French as official language, etc. This is the most important article in the Traité de Cession, which ensures and safeguardes the personal interest of the people regarding their special administrative status.

The Article II of 1956 Traité de Cession which is valid in both English and French versions, states that,
 (The Establishments will keep the benefit of the special administrative status in force prior to 1 November 1954. Any constitutional changes in this status which may be made subsequently shall be made after ascertaining the wishes of the people.)

De jure Transfer
Treaty of cession was signed by the two countries in May 1956 was ratified by the French parliament in May 1962. On 16 August 1962 India and France exchanged the instruments of ratification under which France ceded to India full sovereignty over the territories it held. Every year on 16 August, the De jure Transfer Day (Vidhitāntaraṇa Dinamu in Telugu language) was nominally celebrated throughout Puducherry Union Territory. Later, owing to the initiative by the Lt. Governor Kiran Bedi, this day was celebrated for the first time by the Puducherry government. Until 2016 it was merely a public holiday with no official celebrations took place.

Merger with the Union Territory of Pondicherry
Pondicherry and the settlements of Karikal, Mahé and Yanaon became a Union Territory with effect from 7 January 1963 by the 14th amendment to the Indian Constitution, which was notified in The Gazette of India on 29 December 1962. In the same year, on 10 May, as the people aspired for a popular Government, the Indian Parliament enacted the Government of Union Territories Act, 1963 that came into force on 1 July 1963, and the pattern of Government prevailing in the rest of the country was introduced in this territory also, but subject to certain limitations.

Dates of important events of merger of French India

 Some communes of Pondicherry were liberated. The communes of Nettapacom, Tiroubouvane were liberated on 31 March 1954 and 6 April 1954 respectively. Also, some villages of Bahour commune were liberated around same time.

Geography

The district lies in the delta of the Godavari River; the town is situated where at the confluence of the Koringa River, nine kilometres from the Bay of Bengal on the Circar coast.

Soil
Yanam's soil is alluvium consisting of sand clay and gravel. It is grey black and clay-like in composition. A few thin layers of sandy clay or sand approximating 0.3 metres in thickness, are intercalated with the clay soil. The river sand on the bank of Gauthami, Godavari consist of quartz, felspar and mica, with monazite found in the black streaks. There are no minerals of economic value in the region.

Irrigation

Yanam receives irrigation water via the Bank Canal, which begins at the Dowleswaram headworks of Sir Arthur Cotton's barrage on the River Godavari, downstream from Rajahmundry. The canal runs towards east to Pillanka, a village near Yanam, and is popularly known as French Channel, having been built under a 1949 agreement between the then French Government and the Government of India. It provides irrigation and drinking water to the areas west of the Coringa River.

After its merger with the Republic of India, irrigation was provided to about 5.6 km2 of dry land on the eastern side of the Coringa River by constructing an irrigation canal, the Adivipolam Channel, from the tail end of Tallarevu South Canal and the starting point of the Neelapalli Channel on the right side. The work was undertaken by the Andhra Pradesh Public Works Department in 1964, and was completed and commissioned in June 1966. Like the French Channel, it provides irrigation and drinking water.

Climate

Yanam's climate is characterised by high humidity (over 70% in the day and 60% in the evenings throughout the year), a hot summer season (with humidity of 68 to 80%), and plentiful rainfall. It enjoys the benefits of both the Southwest and Northeast monsoons. Average annual rainfall is 1226 mm.

Temperature

Temperatures in Yanam range from 27 °C to 45 °C in summer, and 17 °C to 28 °C in winter. From February, temperatures start rising rapidly until May, which is the hottest month, with the mean maximum around 37 °C and mean minimum around 28 °C.  Humidity being high, the heat is exhausting. The maximum temperature on some days in May or early June, before the onset of the south-west monsoon, may touch 47 °C. The sea breeze affords some relief in the afternoons.

Similarly, pre-monsoon thunder-showers may also bring relief on some days. With the onset of the monsoon in June the temperature falls rapidly, and usually remains steady until September. In this season the mean maximum temperature is around 32 °C, and night temperatures fall rapidly until December or January, when day temperatures are around 27 °C, and night temperatures around 19 °C. At times the minimum temperature may drop to 14 °C. December and January are the coolest months.

Demographics

 India census, Yanam had a population of 31,362. Males constitute 51% of the population and females 49%. In Yanam, 14% of the population is under 6 years of age.
 1843 – 4,000
 1882 – 4,536
 1884 – 4,552
 1885 – 4,266
 1900 - 5,005
 1901 – 4,681
 1911 – 4,727
 1926 – 4,995
 1931 – 5,249
 1936 – 5,220
 1941 – 5,711
 1948 – 5,853
 1961 - 7,032
 1971 – 8,291
 1981 – 11,631
 1991 – 20,297
 2001 - 25,511
 2011 - 31,500
 2014 - 35,000

Villages
Apart from the town of Yanam itself, Agraharam, Darialatippa, Farampeta, Guerempeta, Savithrinagar, Kanakalapeta, Kurasampeta and Mettakur villages fall under the district's jurisdiction.

Literacy
Yanam has a literacy rate of 80%, higher than the national average of 74.04%, with male literacy at 84% and female literacy at 77%.

French nationality

After liberation, the French government offered citizenship to the people living in colonies of French India, i.e., Pondichéry, Mahé, Karikal and Yanaon. French law made it easy for thousands of colons, ethnic or national French from former colonies of North and East Africa, India and Indochina to live in mainland France.

In Yanam, some 10,000 people chose French nationality. According to some estimates, nearly 120 to 150 Telugu families from former French India live in France. On the other hand, there are some French nationals living in Yanam and enjoying French pension (In Telugu, Guddi Pinchanu).

The Yanam French Peoples Association was formed and its president is Penupothu Suryanarayan. As of the 2000s, around 80 French nationals live in Yanam.

Court House (Palais de justice)

The Court building is situated in an ancient white monument building of French architecture. It is called the Palais de justice (Court House) and located at Thiagaraja Street, Yanam to the next of Municipality building.  The building has two floors - the ground floor is the court and the first floor is the residential quarters of the judge.  The building was renovated in 1967 and inaugurated by Thiru S.L. Silam, the then Lieutenant Governor of Puducherry.

Dutch India
Yanam Judicial Magistrate Court is an ancient court formed prior to the French domain i.e. before 1725 while Yanam was as a Dutch colony.  The Judicial Magistrate Court was existing then.

Subsequently, while this area came under the French on the reorganisation of French domain in 1725 the same court has been converted as French Court under French Law as a Judicial Court.  Both civil and criminal cases tried there.

After independence
After independence, the court was converted as an Indian Court as a Judicial Magistrate Court, Yanam in 1956, whereas, the Regional Administrative Officer of Yanam was the judge of the court having both executive and judicial powers on civil and criminal cases.

After bifurcation of the judiciary, the court came under a separate Judicial Department of Government of Puducherry and under the administration of the High Court, Madras and it was termed as Judicial First Class Magistrate Court cum District Munsif Court. Subsequently, under the reform by theHigh Court, Madras, the Yanam was upgraded to that of Subordinate Judge (Civil Judge-Senior Division)/Assistant Sessions Judge cum Judicial Magistrate of I Class in 2000.  Now because of this upgrade, all the civil cases up to the pecuniary jurisdiction of Rs. 500,000s are triable by the court. ON the criminal side, the court has jurisdiction to try all cases up to 307 IPC except cases having a death sentence.  Further the court is empowered to deal with the motor accident claims, family cases, LAOPs (Land Acquisition of Puducherry), etc., currently S D Srinivas, Sr.Advocate serving as Public prosecutor cum Asst Govt. Pleader since November 2022.

Notable people

First Laurel Poet of Andhra, Chellapilla Venkata Kavi (1870–1950), One of the duo of the famous Tirupati Venkata Kavulu  lived here. There were poets such as the late Villa Reddi Naidu, V. Venkataswami Naidu. Some important politicians include Kanakala Tatayya Naidou and Md. Abdul Razzaq.

Samatam Krouschnaya lived in Yanam and wrote books in Telugu language. Samatam was a pro-French activist. He was acting mayor of Yanaon during merger struggle. He was killed at the age of 78 by Indian military while Yanam being seized during Coup d'État de Yanaon. 

A prominent leader who was instrumental in the merger of Yanam into India was Dadala Rafael Ramanayya. He was born in Farampeta and became a key leader of the liberation of Yanam and the other French settlements. He was at the forefront of the struggle to liberate Yanam and facilitate its merger into India. He was leader who led Coup d'État de Yanaon on 13 June 1954 and subsequently functioned as head of its provisional government.

Another prominent leader who was also key player in the merger was mayor Madimchetty Satianandam. He became prominent in Yanam politics during the 1940s and after the election of 1948, he was elected as mayor of Yanam. When he switched to pro-merger camp headed by Dadala, his home got pillaged by people. Aftermath liberation, his involvement in Yanam politics reduced gradually.

In early 20th century, Bezawada Bapa Naidou was Mayor of Yanam. He was murdered in Pondicherry. 

One of Bapa Naidou's councillors in the "Conseil Local de Yanaon" was Diwan Bouloussou Soubramaniam Sastroulou of Bouloussou family. He was prominent personality and loyal follower of Bapa Naidou. Bouloussou had been one of Judge advocates at Criminal court of Yanam and he worked as Diwan for "Manyam Zamindar" before being elected as Councilor. His son, Bulusu Jaganadha Sastry was a prominent electrical engineer and philanthropist.

Bezawada charan Naidou's bitter opponent The Grand Old Man of Yanam, Kamichetty Venugopala Rao Naidou had been active in politics in French Yanaon. After the death of Bapa Naidou, he became Mayor of Yanam (Maire de Yanaon).

Venugopala Rao Naidou's son, Kamichetty Sri Parassourama Varaprassada Rao Naidu (former MLA and Speaker, Puducherry) dominated Yanam politics after its independence for almost four decades. He was elected as MLA more than five times and been speaker for Puducherry.

Malladi Krishna Rao is a politician of Indian National Congress and was Minister for Revenue includes Mines, Excise, Tourism, Civil Aviation, Sports and fisheries.

Present day

Local administration

Following the introduction of the Pondicherry Municipalities Act, 1973, four municipalities came into existence in Pondicherry, Karaikal, Mahé and Yanam towns. The entities of Karaikal, Mahe and Yanam communes formed the municipalities of Karaikal, Mahe and Yanam. Under the new law, all functions excluding those assigned to the Chairman (i.e., those hitherto exercised by the Mayor) appointed under the municipal decree came to be exercised by the Commissioner. The Mayors were also relieved of their day-to-day administrative responsibilities enabling them to be in greater contact with the public. Commissioners were appointed as the Chief Executive Heads of the Municipalities, in ranks according to the grade of the municipalities.

Yanam Municipality is composed of 10 municipal wards,
Mettakur
Ambedkar Nagar
Vishnalayam
Pillaraya
Giriumpeta
Farampeta
Pydikondala
Pedapudi
Aghraharam
Kanakalapeta

Legislative administration

As the people aspired for a popular government, the Indian Parliament enacted the Government of Union Territories Act, 1963 that came into force on 1 July 1963, and the pattern of government prevailing in the rest of the country was introduced in this territory. Under Article 239 of the Indian Constitution, the President of India appoints an Administrator to head the administration of the territory. The Pondicherry Representative Assembly was converted into the Legislative Assembly of Pondicherry on 1 July 1963 as per Section 54(3) of The Union Territories Act, 1963 and its members were deemed to have been elected to the Assembly. The elections for the Puducherry Legislative Assembly held since 1964. Thus, the MLAs of Yanam to the First Legislvative Assembly (1963-1964) were Smt.Kamichetty Savithri and Shri Kamichetty Sri Parassourama Varaprassada Rao Naidu. Smt. Savithri also happens to be the First lady MLA of Yanam.

After delimitation in 1964, Yanam was allocated with one seat in the Puducherry Legislative Assembly. From 1964 to 1989, Kamichetty Sri Parassourama Varaprassada Rao Naidu held this constituency as his pocket borough until his death without facing any challenge in winning the seat consecutively in 1964 (INC), 1969 (IND), 1974 (IND), 1977 (JP), 1980 (IND) and in 1985 (INC).

The present MLA of Yanam is Shri. Malladi Krishna Rao. He contested from 1996 with no defeat and won consecutively for thrice as the Independent candidate and shifted to the (INC) in 2007.

Culture
Yanam has a mixed French and Telugu culture, sometimes called Frelugu. Signboards saying Soyez le bienvenue (Be Welcome!) when entering and Merci Bien (Thanks!) when leaving the town are common.

Official languages

The official languages used in Yanam for most of the official purposed are Telugu and English.
French is also an official language of Puducherry Union territory. Though it was official language of French India (1673–1954), its official language status was preserved by Traité de Cession (Treaty of Cession) signed by India and France on 28 May 1956 and Pondicherry assembly resolution in 1963. It remained as de jure official language of Puducherry U.T by the Article XXVIII of 1956 Traité de Cession, which states that,
 (The French language shall remain the official language of the Establishments so long as the elected representatives of the people shall not decide otherwise.)

An official mention in Rajya Sabha Parliamentary debates during 2006 confirm that Puducherry have all these five languages as official.

Tourism
Yanam is covered with coconut trees. It is located over the banks of the Gauthami Godavari River. Humidity is high in this region. The river Gauthami Godavari is one of the main branches of the river Godavari. It enters the Bay of Bengal after flowing about 12 km through Yanam.

Yanam Ferry Road was inaugurated by the Chief Minister of Puducherry, Shri R.V. Janaki Raman on 11 January 2000.

Transport

Yanam is located on NH 216. The nearest major railway station to the town is Kakinada Town railway station which is 25 km away. The nearest airport to Yanam is Rajahmundry Airport which is 65 km away.

Festivals

Śrī Rājarājeśwara Kalyāṇōtsavālu

Śrī Rājarājeśwara Kalyāṇōtsavām at Yanam is an annual festival at Sivalayam celebrated for twenty days in the month of Māgha (January/February). Kalyāṇam will be performed on Māgha Śuddha Dvādaśi i.e., on the twelfth day of the festival. Lord's holy consort is Goddess Śrī Rājarājeśwari Ammavāru

Venkanna Babu Kalyāṇōtsavālu

The Kalyāṇōtsavam Festival is celebrated in the month of Phālguṇa (February/March) every year by the people of Yanam.  The festival commences on Phālguṇa Śuddha Pāḍyami with Lord Venkanna Babu's Kalyāṇam. On that day he will be made bridegroom and then a procession on streets with chariots each day occurs and Ponnavōhanam, Ratha Yātra (Rathōtsavam) and Chakratīrtham are the important events of the festival. Vāhana Samprōkshaṇa (ritual cleansing of the chariot) will be done by priests every day for each Vāhanam used for procession. During the festival days, 150,000 devotees come to Yanam to receive the blessings of Lord Venkanna Babu.

The Ratham was built in 1950 by the then Committee under then Assemblée Répresentative, Kanakala Tatayya Naidou. The Ratham's weight is around 15 tonnes. It was partially damaged to the heavy cyclonic storm in November 1996 but was renovated in 1998. The Ratham was carried throughout the town in the early days. After the electrification work, the Ratham's route has been limited from Chinna Center to the Kotha Bus Stand. It is carried by devotees singing slogans and bhajans. The Government of Puducherry has declared a holiday for Yanam on this special event.

Catholic Festival
Every year in March, a Catholic Festival is celebrated. Devotees come and honor and pray to Mother Mary. Devotees are not only Christians but also Muslims, Hindus and from other religions.

Fête de Pondichéry
Fête de Pondichéry is a three-day annual cultural festival conducted by the Department of Art and Culture of the government of Puducherry.

Brahmotsavam
It is conducted for Lord Venkanna Babu in Yanam during the months of September/October and resembles the Tirupati Brahmotsavam. It is a 10-day festival that attracts millions of people from the surrounding villages of Yanam.

Places of worship

Sivalayam
Lord Śrī Rājarājeśwara Temple is at Yanam on the bank of Atreya Godavari (also known as Corangi river). The temple was built by the Chalukya kings of Rajamahendravaram (Rajahmundry) in the 15th century. The sculptures of those period are present in the temple. Though Kalyāṇōtsavām and Rathōstavam has been performed since old days. It is carried by devotees singing slogans and bhajans.

The Kalyāṇōtsavam Festival is celebrated in the month of Māgha (January/February) every year by the people of Yanam. The festival commences on Māgha Śuddha Pāḍyami, Lord Śrī Rājarājeśwara will be made bridegroom and then a procession on streets with chariots each day occurs and Kalyāṇam, Rathōtsavam and Triśūlatīrtham are the important events of the festival. Vāhana Samprōkshaṇa (ritual cleansing of the chariot) will be done by priests everyday for each Vāhanam used for procession. During the festival days, devotees come to Yanam to receive the blessings of Lord Śrī Rājarājeśwara.

Venkanna Babu Temple
A Vishnu Temple is present in Vishnalayam street (Rue Vichenou) of Yanam named Alivelu Manga Sametha Shri Venkateswara Alayam. The God is well known as "Venkanna Babu", "Chaldikudu Venkanna" and "Meesala Venkanna". The speciality of the Temple is that the Swamy Idol has big moustaches like Lord Sathyanarayana Swamy of Annavaram. The temple was built by the Chalukya kings of Rajamahendravaram (Rajahmundry) in the 15th century. The sculptures of that period are present in the temple.

The Venkanna Babu Temple had been performing child marriages during the pre-independence days. Due to the efforts of the Social Reformer, Shri Raja Ram Mohun Roy, the Sarada Act (prevention of Child Marriages) was implemented by the then British government in India.

As the Yanam Region was under French rule, the people from the nearby state, came to the Temple to perform child marriages. Even people from Madras, Hyderabad and other long distant places came to Yanam to conduct child marriages. 

However, the temple was demolished for a facelift in 2020 and became an controversial issue in Yanam.

Grand Mosque
The site for the mosque was donated by the French Government in 1848. At that time a small mosque was constructed. Then in 1956, it was remodelled. It was demolished in 1978 and a new mosque constructed. In 1999–2000, the mosque was expanded to become the Grand Mosque. Around 200 persons can pray in this mosque at a time. Every year, Ramadan, Eid al-Adha and Mawlid functions are celebrated. The mosque caters to the people of nearby villages like Thallarevu, Kolanka, Sunkarapalem. which are in the adjacent state of Andhra Pradesh.

Catholic church

The monument in remembrance of the Catholic French rulers is linked with the church named St. Ann's Catholic Church. Built in the European style, the furniture and decoration articles were imported from France.  The church was built in 1846 by French missionaries. The foundation stone was laid down by Father Michel Lecnam who he died on 30 April 1836 before completion of the church work. In his remembrance, a culvert was fixed in the church. The church work was completed in 1846.

Sports 
YSR Indoor Stadium is an indoor stadium in the city which has hosted matches of Junior National Badminton Championships, South Zone basketball championships as well as few volleyball and basketball matches. In 2011 the Indian Volley League's third leg matches were held there, and it became the home of the Yanam Tigers.

See also
 Municipal Administration in French India
Yanam Śrī Rājarājeśwara Kalyāṇōtsavam
Yanam Venkanna Babu Kalyāṇōtsavam
Yanam Venkanna Babu Brahmōtsavam
 Pondicherry (Lok Sabha constituency)
 Puducherry Legislative Assembly
 Pondicherry Municipality
 Yanam Municipality
 YSR Indoor Stadium
 French East India Company
 Dadala Raphael Ramanayya
 Coup d'État de Yanaon
 French colonial empire
 French India

References

External links

Official regional website of Yanam
Future of French India, by Russel H. Fifield (Associate Professor of Political Science at University of Michigan)
Pravasandhrulu in France: identity and integration by Jonnalagadda Anuradha, France
Official website of the government of the Union Territory of Puducherry
Indian Ministry for External Affairs – 1956 Treaty of Cession
The French and Portuguese Settlements in India
Tourism in Yanam

 
Cities and towns in Yanam district